Swede Erickson was a player in the National Football League. He was a member of the Kenosha Maroons during the 1924 NFL season.

References

Kenosha Maroons players
Year of birth missing
Year of death missing